Dejavu is a 2022 Indian Tamil-language mystery thriller film directed by Arvindh Srinivasan and produced by K. Vijay Pandi and  P. G. Muthiah. The film stars Arulnithi, Madhoo, Achyuth Kumar, and Smruthi Venkat. the film was released theatrically on 22 July 2022 and received mixed to positive reviews from critics and audience, and became an box office success. The film was remade in Telugu as Repeat which was directly released on Hotstar.

Plot

A novelist, Subramani goes to a police station while very drunk to make a complaint that he has been receiving harassing calls from the fictional characters he had created in his novels and demands police protection. Police mock his claim and send him away. Subramani goes back home and starts writing again. The next day police arrive at his house and enquire him about a call they had received from a woman named Pooja, who had called the control room saying she had been kidnapped. The woman mentioned the writer's name and location briefly before her mobile was switched off. Police check with Subramani and are shocked to see he had written about Pooja. They thrash him as they enquire about this but his neighbors come to his rescue, recording the incident and uploading it on social media. This causes embarrassment to the police. The incident catches the attention of DGP Asha who is trying to keep things tidy for PM's visit. Asha checks with the police and is initially disappointed with the way things are handled, but shocked to find that her daughter Pooja was kidnapped and she made the call to the police control room. Now things become personal and Asha meets the writer herself to enquire about pooja. Subramani says he is innocent and has no clue about the incident, but whatever he had written in his story exactly happened. Police start wondering if it's a case of ESP.

The news of Asha's missing daughter and police harassment of Subramani in this regard starts circulating in social media. Asha is thus forced to address the media denying any such claims. Police assign a constable to monitor what Subramani writes. She checks with a DGP of another state and asks for an officer to help her retrieve Pooja. The DGP mentions he will send an officer Vikram Kumar to support her. The writer opens this incident as it happens further prompting the question of his ESP power.

Vikram arrives and starts his inquiry. He suspects the writer uses some communication with the outside world with a hidden mobile.
However, that does not turn out to be the case. Vikram comes to know Pooja had attended a party last evening, where she had an issue with one of the guests. Pooja then left the party midway and missing since. Vikram continues his investigation enquiring with Pooja's colleagues trying to track Pooja but in vain.

Subramani continues his story which miraculously keeps happening in real life. He predicts even a taxi number that Pooja's colleague uses.
He writes of another kidnapping prompting police to enquire about other cases reported on that date.

We see a cab driver report a case of a young girl's kidnapping by some people in a BMW car. The driver who reported the case vanishes after giving a verbal statement. Asha and Vikram checked on the CCTV to identify the driver. Asha says the driver was someone she knew but was already dead.

A dead body is thrown by some thugs on the sea, the whole incident is predicted by Subramani.

We then come to know about a case closed a year ago which involved a brutal rape and murder of a woman named Janani. It is revealed that rowdy youth in the same BMW car prophesied by Subramani had kidnapped raped and murdered the woman Janani a year ago and a taxi driver Ravi was the only witness. A police team under Asha tracks down the youths, but one of them is the son of an influential central minister who had considerable power. He influences Asha to leave his son out of the picture in exchange for her promotion to DGP. Asha gladly agrees and encounters Ravi instead. She frames false charges on Ravi, making him the prime accused in the case justifying his encounter.

Vikram breaks the case down with his intelligence. He traces Pooja and rescues her from the same influential central minister's son.
Vikram then identifies the mastermind behind the entire scene.

Turns out that the taxi driver Ravi had a twin brother who is a techie. He teams up with his friends and father who is none other than Subramani. Their objective is simple: bring out the facts on Ravi's case and restore his reputation. To do this they recreated the kidnapping of Janani with Pooja to create a media sensation that would bring out the facts. Vikram puts the facts in front of Asha and she orders Vikram to encounter kill everyone involved in the case as a cleanup activity.

Vikram sympathizes with Subramani and his son and kills the minister's son and releases the footage of Asha ordering the cleanup. This makes Asha lose her job and be subjected to inquiry.

In a final twist, it is revealed that Vikram is not himself but Janani's boyfriend. Though Janani is critically injured doctors predict she would recover fine, Asha fears that if Janani survives she would spill the beans on the truth about Ravi. So she kills Janani in the hospital. Her boyfriend under the name of Vikram has now taken his revenge against Asha and the minister's son.

Asha tries to explain to the angry and disgusted Pooja, but the latter refuses to talk to her. Out of guilt, Asha goes into a room, closes the door, and shoots herself dead.

Cast

Production
In November 2020 the film shooting was started and due to Covid Second Wave, the shoot of the film was postponed and finally completed in June 2021.

Release

Theatrical 
The title of the film and the first look poster of the film were unveiled by director Venkat Prabhu, M. Sasikumar in his Twitter account on 21 July 2021. In January 2022, the film's teaser was released by Udhayanidhi Stalin. The movie is announced to be released on 22 July 2022.

Home media 
The satellite rights of the film is sold to Colors TV.

Reception 
The film received mixed to positive reviews. A critic from Behindwoods wrote that "Dejavu is a watchable thriller with twists and turns". Logesh Balachandran of The Times of India rated the film 2.0 out of 5 stars and stated that "Arulnithi's effort to try something inventive is laudable, but Dejavu is certainly not a film you can experience more than once." Haricharan Pudipeddi of Hindustan Times after reviewing the film stated that "As far as a thriller goes, Dejavu manages to impress to a large extent and leaves hardly any room for complaints.". The film managed to run 4 weeks in theaters and was declared as Super Hit.

External links

References 

2020s Tamil-language films
Indian crime thriller films
Indian police films
2022 directorial debut films
Tamil films remade in other languages